Scarlet Saint, also known as The Scarlet Sinner, is a 1925 American silent drama film directed by George Archainbaud and starring Mary Astor, Lloyd Hughes, and Frank Morgan. The film's sets were designed by the art director Milton Menasco.

Plot
As described in a film magazine review, a young woman who as a girl was betrothed to an Austrian baron decides on the eve of the wedding that she cannot marry the titled man because she is in love with a young American. The baron tricks the other man into a duel and forces the woman into marriage to save the younger man from a long term in jail. After a long period of struggle to retain his wife, the baron at length releases her and wishes her happiness with the American.

Cast

Preservation
With no prints of Scarlet Saint located in any film archives, it is a lost film.

References

Bibliography
 Lowe, Denise. An Encyclopedic Dictionary of Women in Early American Films: 1895-1930. Routledge, 2014.

External links

1925 films
1925 drama films
Silent American drama films
Films directed by George Archainbaud
American silent feature films
1920s English-language films
Lost American films
American black-and-white films
1925 lost films
Lost drama films
1920s American films